Tripe is a type of edible offal from the stomachs of various domestic animals, and is also an informal term for nonsense or rubbish.

Tripe may also refer to:

 John Swete (1752–1821), born John Tripe, English clergyman, artist, antiquary, historian, topographer and author 
 Linnaeus Tripe (1822–1902), British photographer
 Mollie Tripe (1870–1939), New Zealand artist and art teacher
 Robert Tripe (1973–2015), New Zealand actor
 A nickname of the Sopwith Triplane First World War fighter aircraft

See also
 Rock tripe, a lichen